Knínice is a municipality and village in Jihlava District in the Vysočina Region of the Czech Republic. It has about 200 inhabitants.

Administrative parts
The village of Bohusoudov is an administrative part of Knínice.

References

Villages in Jihlava District